

Medalists

Clay Shooting

Target Shooting

Medal table

References

2003 Games of the Small States of Europe
Shooting at the Games of the Small States of Europe